James Murdock,  (August 15, 1871 – May 15, 1949) was a Canadian politician.

Born in Brighton, England, Murdock first ran for the House of Commons of Canada as the Liberal candidate in the 1921 federal election in the Ontario riding of Toronto South. Although defeated, he was appointed Minister of Labour in the cabinet of Mackenzie King shortly after the election. The current MP in the riding of Kent, Archibald McCoig, gave up his seat and was appointed to the Senate of Canada in 1922. Murdock was acclaimed to this seat in the resulting 1922 by-election.

While Minister of Labour in 1923, Murdock was embroiled in controversy after he withdrew funds from the Home Bank of Canada a day or two before its collapse based on information he obtained as a member of the Cabinet.

He was defeated in the 1925 election in the riding of Toronto—High Park and again in 1926.

In 1930, he was summoned to the Senate representing the senatorial division of Parkdale, Ontario on the advice of Prime Minister Mackenzie King. He served until his death in 1949.

References

1871 births
1949 deaths
Canadian senators from Ontario
Liberal Party of Canada MPs
Liberal Party of Canada senators
Members of the House of Commons of Canada from Ontario
Members of the King's Privy Council for Canada